Romankautsy is a rural locality (a selo) in Novokiyevsky Selsoviet of Mazanovsky District, Amur Oblast, Russia. The population was 142 as of 2018. There are 4 streets.

Geography 
Romankautsy is located on the left bank of the Kamushka River, 26 km southeast of Novokiyevsky Uval (the district's administrative centre) by road. Razdolnoye is the nearest rural locality.

References 

Rural localities in Mazanovsky District